Lee Chang-Min (born 20 January 1994) is a South Korean footballer who plays as a central midfielder for Jeju United.

Career
He joined Gyeongnam FC on loan right after signed with Bucheon FC in 2014.

Club statistics

International goals
Scores and results list South Korea's goal tally first.

Honours

International
South Korea U-23
 King's Cup: 2015

South Korea
 EAFF East Asian Cup : 2017

Individual 
 K League 1 Best XI: 2017

References

External links 

1994 births
Living people
Association football midfielders
South Korean footballers
South Korea under-17 international footballers
South Korea under-20 international footballers
South Korea under-23 international footballers
South Korea international footballers
Bucheon FC 1995 players
Gyeongnam FC players
Jeonnam Dragons players
Jeju United FC players
K League 2 players
K League 1 players
Sportspeople from North Gyeongsang Province
Footballers at the 2016 Summer Olympics
Olympic footballers of South Korea